Western Boat Building Company was a company based in Tacoma, Washington from 1916 until 1982. The company was founded by Martin Petrich, Joe M. Martinac and William Vickart. Within a few years, Joe Martinac left the partnership to go to the Tacoma Shipbuilding Company, and later started his own company. William Vickart was killed in an accident in 1921, leaving Martin Petrich the sole owner. In the early 1920s the company was located at the foot of Starr Street on part of the former Tacoma Mill Company property after that property was destroyed in a fire. Later yards were located on East 11th Street ), D Street, and Marine View Drive. Towards the end of World War II, the company founded its Fairliner division, which made high-speed boats. Before a devastating yard fire in 1950, the company was the largest builder of wooden pleasure boats on the United States West Coast. The company continued to build boats until 1982.

Shipbuilding
During its 65-year history, the firm built hundreds of boats. Among these were:

 (ex-Western Traveler )

See also

 Seattle-Tacoma Shipbuilding Corporation#Shipbuilding in Puget Sound

External links
 List of boats constructed
 List of images at the Tacoma Public Library

References

Defunct shipbuilding companies of the United States
American boat builders
American companies established in 1916
Manufacturing companies established in 1916
Shipbuilding in Washington (state)
1982 disestablishments in Washington (state)
Defunct companies based in Tacoma, Washington
1916 establishments in Washington (state)